Lewis Hall is one of the 32 Residence Halls at the University of Notre Dame.  Lewis is located northwest of the Main Building and south of St. Joseph's Lake. It was named 2013 Hall of the Year. The coat of arms features two chick, the mascot of the hall, in blue and yellow, the hall colors.

History 
Built in 1965, Lewis Hall was funded by Julia Lewis in honor of her husband, Chicago philanthropist Frank Lewis. Lewis Hall was the first residence hall at Notre Dame constructed for female students. It originally served as a residence for religious sisters studying for master's degrees and in 1968 also provided housing for laywomen pursuing graduate degrees. It became a women's undergraduate residence hall in 1972, the year Notre Dame began admitting female undergraduates. The first undergraduate woman accepted at Notre Dame, Mary Ann Proctor, lived with the graduate students and nuns. With more than 250 residents, Lewis is one of the largest women's halls on campus.
 The building features two artworks by Croatian sculptor and artist-in-residence Ivan Meštrović: a bronze crucifix in the chapel, and a Madonna and Child (1956) in the courtyard. While at Notre Dame, Mestrovic worked primarily with plaster due to his advanced age and the difficulty of handling and working with large blocks of marble or wood. Several of his works were not cast into bronze until after his death, including the Madonna and Child.
The current rector is Megan Moore.

Traditions
Lewis' most famous event is Crush Week, which culminates in a dance.  Lewis also sponsors a 3K race called the Crush Rush.  LHOP is a hall-wide breakfast event where each floor prepares a different plate.

Notable residents
 Condoleezza Rice '75
 Anne Thompson '79

Room information
Lewis Hall has 132 rooms and features the following room configurations:
18 singles
91 doubles
3 triples
5 quads (2 double rooms attached for 4 people to live in)
3 "six-chicks" (2 rooms for 3 people to live in each, plus an extra large common room)
8 RA rooms
3 apartments for Hall Staff (rector and 2 ARs) 
1 in-residence apartment (priest)

References

External links
 University of Notre Dame Office of Housing
 Lewis Hall official website
 Lewis Hall Twitter
 ND Magazine

Residential buildings completed in 1965
University of Notre Dame residence halls
University and college buildings completed in 1965